Milton is an unincorporated community in Lamar County, Texas, United States.

Notes

Unincorporated communities in Lamar County, Texas
Unincorporated communities in Texas